is a 2002 Japanese animated action adventure film directed by  based on the Beyblade manga series by Takao Aoki. It was released theatrically in Japan on August 17, 2002.

Set between the events of Beyblade V-Force and G-Revolution, the movie is a non-canon story that offers an alternate version of how Tyson (Takao) and Daichi met.

Plot 
The movie begins with the battle of Tyson with a boy in BBA Final Tournament of World Championships. Just as the battle ends, a mysterious boy named Daichi enters the stadium, challenging Tyson to battle with him. Tyson reluctantly agrees and both launch their blades. On the other hand, a man named Professor Tengai takes his students to a trip in an ancient ruins where he explains to them - which are hidden dark bit beasts sealed to rest by an ancient king. Back in the fight, Tyson starts to defeat Daichi who, in rage, starts empowering his blade and a scar on his forehead lightens up. In the ancient ruins, because of that scar's mysterious light, a rock breaks to reveal a secret chamber. Daichi is defeated back at the stadium but another story has begun in the ruins. The Professor and his students enter the hidden cave in awe and reach a mysterious hall with a stone table in the middle. They reach it and suddenly the bit beast which were sealed in the walls of the hall become free and enslave the four children. They become evil and imprison the Professor because their memory is lost. Tyson soon realize throughout the movie that those dark bit beasts now want to seal the light bit beasts of the four Blade Breakers, and that those bit beasts are actually the dark versions of the four sacred bit beasts. Finally, a great battle takes place in which the Blade Breakers are victorious. The dark beasts are once again put to rest with the whole ruins collapsing in the end.

Voice cast

Release 
Toho released the film in Japan alongside Ape Escape The Movie: Battle for the Golden Pippo Helmet on August 17, 2002. The film grossed $3,216,050 at the box office to rank as the 68th highest-grossing film in the country that year. To promote the movie, Takao Aoki drew a partial adaptation that ran in CoroCoro Comic, which was later republished in the final tankōbon of the Beyblade manga released by Shogakukan and Viz Media. VAP released the film on VHS and DVD in Japan on March 21, 2003. Takara produced movie specific tops that were released via ticket purchase campaigns, preorders for the home video release and through Beyblade blind boxes. Warner Music Japan published a 21-song soundtrack CD on August 7, 2002.

An English version, produced by Nelvana, was released as direct-to-video by Miramax Family in North America on March 22, 2005. The original score was replaced with reused music from the English dub of the TV series, and the film is presented in a 1.33:1 crop, instead of the Japanese release's 1.78:1 aspect ratio. The release includes a bonus featurette on the production of the English dub alongside highlights of the 2004 Beyblade World Championship. Echo Bridge Home Entertainment later reissued the DVD in 2012 and 2013. The film premiered in Canada on YTV on March 4, 2006 and in the United States on Cartoon Network on November 21, 2009.

Unlike the other Disney-era content of the Miramax library, an English version has not been reissued by Paramount Home Entertainment via Miramax Family.

It also aired in Hindi dub in India on Hungama TV.

Reception 
John Sinnott of DVDTalk remarked “This movie of battling tops just seemed stupid.”

References

External links 
 Official Website 
 Official d-rights Beyblade The Movie: Fierce Battle website 
 Official d-rights Beyblade The Movie: Fierce Battle website 
 

2002 anime films
2000s action adventure films
2000s Japanese films
Beyblade
Anime films based on manga
Animated action films
Animated adventure films
Japanese action adventure films
Toho animated films
Nelvana films
Buena Vista Home Entertainment direct-to-video films